The Cotswold Gliding Club (CGC) is based at Aston Down airfield, between Cirencester and Stroud in Gloucestershire, South West England. The club maintains a fleet of aircraft for training purposes, and is a centre for cross-country gliding and competitions.

Club 
CGC was formed in 1964. It was initially based at Long Newnton airfield near Tetbury, but in 1967 moved to its current home, Aston Down—at that time still a military airfield. In 1980-1, with the help of Sports Council grants and other loans, the club purchased a large part of the airfield when it was auctioned off by the Ministry of Defence.  Having since acquired further land, CGC now owns most of the airfield within the perimeter track.

CGC has some 200 members, including 80 students from the University of the West of England (UWE) in Bristol. There are about 30 associate members: these include both pilots (with limited flying rights) and aeromodellers.  In 2007 the CGC widened its membership to include Blokarters.

Airfield 

Aston Down is, by gliding standards, a large airfield. The 1500 m main runway (about one mile) offers scope for launches of —and sometimes up to  when the wind direction is straight down the runway. For many years most launches at Aston Down were by the reverse pulley method, but since the year 2000 the principal method of launch has been by winch. The high launches make it easy to contact the abundant thermals that rise from the well-drained Cotswold limestone to give excellent soaring conditions.  Aerotow launching is increasingly available, particularly in competitions and when westerly or north-westerly winds generate lift off the Cotswold ridge (or "Edge") or wave lift downwind of the Welsh mountains.

The picture shows Aston Down taken from the south. The disused runway in the distance has been partly removed to allow more room for gliders landing on the grass. Blokarting and aeromodelling are restricted to the runway not currently in use for gliding (which varies according to wind direction).

Club fleet 

The club's fleet of aircraft includes two recently acquired modern ASK-21 all-round two-seat training gliders, a DG 500 advanced cross-country trainer which can also be used for aerobatics training, and two ASK-13 two-seat trainers. An ASK-23 is available for early solo pilots. All Club gliders have similar instrumentation and are equipped with audio variometers.

Gliding activity 
The club operates seven days a week during the soaring season (April to September), and on Wednesdays, Fridays and at weekends during the winter months. Members of the public can book trial lessons or more intensive one-day courses, as well as five-day courses.  Group flying for work parties, clubs, etc takes place on Tuesday and Thursday evenings in the summer.

In 2008 the club introduced courses specifically designed to give power pilots a hands-on introduction to soaring flight.

Members receive training from the club's 30 BGA-qualified instructors. This training takes pilots to solo and well beyond—to advanced cross-country flying.  Privately owned motor gliders based at Aston Down are available for club members for field landing and Cross Country Endorsement checks.  During the soaring season many members fly private gliders, usually owned jointly by two or more partners. This flying takes the form of either local soaring or more ambitious cross-country flights, often covering several hundred kilometres. Some examples of recent flights by members of the club can be seen on the BGA Ladder website (2008, the last complete season, and  2009).

Competitions

Aston Down 
The excellent runway and facilities available at Aston Down make it a frequent choice for hosting regional and national gliding competitions. As early as 1962 the National Gliding Championships were held at Aston Down under the auspices of the RAF Gliding and Soaring Association, with the UK's first ever 300-km task being set.  Recent competitions hosted by CGC include the following:
2004 Standard Class Nationals (shown on the right)
2004 Competition Enterprise
2006 15 Metre Nationals
2007 Inter University Task Week
2008 Club Class Nationals
2009 15 Metre Nationals
2010 Open Class and Standard Class Nationals
2011 Junior Championships
2013 Open Class & Standard Class Nationals
2015 Junior National Championships and Cotswold Regionals
2016 20m Multi-Seat and Standard Class Nationals
2017 Standard, Open, 15m & 20m Multi-Seat Nationals
2018 Standard, Open & 15m Class Nationals
2021 Junior Nationals and Cotswold Regionals

Other sites 
Pilots from Cotswold Gliding Club regularly take part in regional and national competitions, as well as informal competitions such as:
Rockpolishers League
An informal group of six local gliding clubs who organize friendly cross-country competitions.
Two Seater Competition at Pocklington
In 2007 the club DG 500 and a private Duo Discus from Aston Down took 15th and 5th positions, respectively, out of 33 entrants. In 2011 Duo Discus 572 was placed first in the National two seater championship 
Competition Enterprise
In 2008 the same two gliders also took part in this competition, which was held at North Hill in Devon.

Other sports 
In 2007 Aston Down was the venue for the British Blokart Championships.  In July 2008 the Cotswold Cycle Racing League held its final round at Aston Down with a 30 km race comprising six circuits of the airfield.

Facilities 
The original control tower houses a briefing room, club room, kitchen and residential accommodation; caravan and camping facilities are also available on site. A large hangar accommodates the club fleet, most of the private gliders owned by club members being stored in trailers or a large, modern back-to-back hangar when not being flown. There is a workshop for maintenance of aircraft, vehicles and winches.
The club has built its own glider flight simulator to expand the training opportunities for club members.

Notes

References

External links 
Cotswold Gliding Club Official website
Webcam view of northeastern end of main runway at 15-minute intervals over the past two hours
UWE Gliding Club
Cotswold Radio Control Society (modellers)
Blokarters UK

Gliding in England
Flying clubs
Sport in Gloucestershire
Organisations based in Gloucestershire
Tourist attractions in Gloucestershire
Kemble, Gloucestershire